The position of City Minister is a United Kingdom Government mid-level ministerial post in HM Treasury. The minister is responsible for the British financial services sector which is commonly known as 'the City'. The post is normally held in combination with another Treasury position, currently the Financial Secretary to the Treasury.

History
The term 'City Minister' was first used as a nickname for the position of Financial Services Secretary to the Treasury which was created by Gordon Brown upon coming to office in October 2008. The only person to have held the office was Lord Myners, who served from October 2008 to May 2010.

In May 2010 as part of the ministerial reorganisation by the Cameron Government the position of Financial Services Secretary to the Treasury was abolished. However, the idea of there being a minister specifically responsible for the City was retained and it was decided that the post would be held concurrently with the position of Financial Secretary to the Treasury, held at the time by Mark Hoban.

Following the promotion of Sajid Javid to Secretary of State for Culture, Media and Sport in April 2014 the portfolio of City Minister was moved from the Financial Secretary to the Treasury to the Economic Secretary to the Treasury.

Following the 2017 snap general election, City Minister Simon Kirby lost his seat and was succeeded by Steve Barclay.

Following Liz Truss becoming Prime Minister, although Richard Fuller retained his position as Economic Secretary to the Treasury, the City Minister brief was removed from him and returned to the Financial Secretary to the Treasury.

List of officeholders
Colour key (for political parties):

References

HM Treasury
Lists of government ministers of the United Kingdom
Ministerial offices in the United Kingdom